The 1931–32 CHL season was the first season of the Central Hockey League, a minor professional ice hockey league in the Midwestern United States. Five teams participated in the league, and the Minneapolis Millers won the championship.

Regular season

External links
Season on hockeydb.com

1931 in ice hockey
1932 in ice hockey